Forgotten Girls is a 1940 American crime film directed by Phil Rosen and written by F. Hugh Herbert, Joseph Moncure March and George Beck. The film stars Louise Platt, Donald Woods, Wynne Gibson, Robert Armstrong, Eduardo Ciannelli and Jack La Rue. The film was released on March 15, 1940, by Republic Pictures.

Plot
Factory worker Judy Wingate financially supports her stepmother Frances, who is keeping company with Eddie Nolan, a gangster. Eddie makes a pass at Judy, who knocks him cold with a skillet. A furious Frances finds Eddie recovering, strikes him again and kills him. But it is Judy who is arrested, convicted and sent to prison for five years.

A reporter covering the trial, Dan Donahue, develops a romantic attraction to Judy, who finds prison bearable, at least being far from her wicked stepmother. A guilty conscience persuades Frances, however, to offer $10,000 from Judy's life insurance policy to mobsters Gorno and Mullins to break her out of jail.

All spirals downhill from there. Judy threatens to go to the police and tell all she knows. Mullins, angry with Frances, runs her down with a car. On her deathbed, Frances attempts to confess, but Gorno shoots her before she can speak. Donahue and the police, however, are able to get the better of the villains and clear Judy's name once and for all.

Cast
Louise Platt as Judy Wingate
Donald Woods as Dan Donahue
Wynne Gibson as Frances Wingate
Robert Armstrong as Grover Mullins
Eduardo Ciannelli as Gorno
Jack La Rue as Eddie Nolan
Barbara Pepper as Eve Abbott
Charles D. Brown as Editor Linton
Sarah Padden as Miss Donaldson
Ann Baldwin as Jackie

References

External links
 

1940 films
American crime films
1940 crime films
Republic Pictures films
Films directed by Phil Rosen
American black-and-white films
Films scored by Paul Sawtell
1940s English-language films
1940s American films